Sean Norman (born 27 November 1966) is an English former footballer who played in the Football League as a midfielder for Colchester United.

Career

Born in Lowestoft, Norman began his playing career with local club Lowestoft Town before joining Colchester United, playing regularly in the reserve team. He made his first-team debut on 23 August 1986 in the opening game of the season, a 3–1 defeat at Lincoln City, coming on as a substitute for Keith Day. He scored one league goal for the club in appearances, his goal the equaliser in a 1–1 draw with Tranmere Rovers on 23 January 1987. Following the sacking of manager Mike Walker, Norman found first-team games hard to come by as he scored his final goal in his final game for the club, a 3–2 win at Layer Road against Peterborough United in the Associate Members Cup on 13 October 1987.

Norman would later join non-league club Wycombe Wanderers for the remainder of the 1987–88 season, where he made 78 appearances during a two-year spell with the club, also earning England semi-professional honours in 1989.

Following his time with Wycombe, Norman joined Wealdstone before signing for Chesham United for £25,000. He later played in New Zealand for Papatoetoe, though he later returned to England, featuring for Chertsey Town, a second spell with Chesham and reconvened with former club Lowestoft.

References

1966 births
Living people
People from Lowestoft
English footballers
Association football midfielders
Lowestoft Town F.C. players
Colchester United F.C. players
Wycombe Wanderers F.C. players
Wealdstone F.C. players
Chesham United F.C. players
Papatoetoe AFC players
Chertsey Town F.C. players
English Football League players
National League (English football) players
England semi-pro international footballers